Corso is a surname. Notable people with the surname include:

Bill Corso, makeup artist
Daniel Corso (born 1978), Canadian hockey player
Gregory Corso (1930–2001), American poet, member of the Beat Generation
Jason J. Corso, American professor of electrical engineering and computer science
Lee Corso (born 1935), American sportscaster
Liza Corso (born 2003), American Paralympic athlete 
Mario Corso (1941–2020), Italian footballer and coach
Niccolò Corso (active circa 1503), Italian painter of the Renaissance
Philip J. Corso (1915–1998), American Army officer

Fictional characters:
Jace Corso, a character in the Canadian science fiction series Dark Matter
Aden Corso, a character in the Canadian science fiction series Stargate SG-1